The Stephen Leacock Memorial Medal for Humour, also known as the Stephen Leacock Medal for Humour or just the Leacock Medal, is an annual Canadian literary award presented for the best book of humour written in English by a Canadian writer, published or self-published in the previous year. The silver medal, designed by sculptor Emanuel Hahn, is a tribute to well-known Canadian humorist Stephen Leacock (1869–1944) and is accompanied by a cash prize of $25,000 (CAD). It is presented in the late spring or early summer each year, during a banquet ceremony in or near Leacock’s hometown of Orillia, Ontario.

The medal is one of the oldest literary prizes in Canada, and is the only one awarded to a work of humour. It has been awarded every year since 1947 with the exception of 1959 when it was reported that no worthy entries had been submitted.

History
The Stephen Leacock Associates, the non-profit organising body behind the award, was founded in 1946 by a loose group of Leacock’s friends and supporters. Although administered and presented separately, in early years the award was announced as part of the Governor General's Awards announcements, later moving to a separate announcement.

Each year the Associates’ board of directors appoints a panel of suitable judges from around the country, and also commissions readers who rank and select from submitted works a long list of ten books, which is later narrowed to a short list of three books (previously five).  The shortlist is typically announced in early May. In 1990, for the only time in the award's history they did not whittle the initial longlist down to a shortlist, but simply announced a shortlist of ten books which were all considered for the final award.

The cash prize began in 1970, as a $2,500 award co-sponsored by Manulife Insurance and the Hudson's Bay Company. The following decades saw gradual increases in the amount of the prize under a number of sponsors, reaching its current value of $15,000 in 2009, sponsored by the TD Bank Financial Group.  As of 2018, both remaining shortlist authors each receive cash prizes of $3,000.

In 1969 the Associates established a quarterly newsletter called The Newspacket to commemorate the centenary of the author’s birth. The publication prints excerpts from nominated books, and is itself a showcase for Canadian humour writing. The Newspacket has been published irregularly in recent years.

In 1977 the group established an annual Student Award for Humour, which honours and encourages young Canadian writers from secondary and post-secondary levels with recognition and cash prizes for the top three.

Organization
The Leacock Award is ceremonially led by a past winner or nominee, who holds the honorary title "Mayor of Mariposa". The duties of this position include giving a speech at the awards ceremony, and representing the Leacock Foundation in other public appearances including McGill University's annual Leacock Lecture. Held by Dan Needles until 2018, the position was taken over by Drew Hayden Taylor in 2019 and renamed "Grand Chief of Mariposa" to reflect Taylor's First Nations heritage.

The Medal 

The medal, cast in silver and designed by Canadian sculptor Emanuel Hahn, is two inches (5.08 cm) in diameter and approximately 0.125 inches (.32 cm) thick. It weighs 3.125 ounces (88.59 g).

On the obverse is a profile of Stephen Leacock’s head and the dates of his lifespan (1869–1944). The words "Stephen Leacock Memorial Medal Founded 1946" are worked around the perimeter.

The reverse side features the words "Orillia  “The Sunshine Town”  Award for Canadian Humour". A jolly face represents the sun resting on waves, and the latitude and longitude of Orillia, Ontario, Canada, appear in small figures at the top. Two small fish swim beneath the waves, and two large mosquitoes are depicted — one on the sun, the other in the water. Below the design, there is room for the winner’s name and date to be inscribed, and below that a small maple leaf emblem.

Winners and nominees

1940s

1950s

1960s

1970s

1980s

1990s

2000s

2010s

2020s

References

External links
Leacock Medal for Humour Website

Canadian literary awards
Comedy and humor literary awards
Canadian comedy and humour awards
Awards established in 1946
1946 establishments in Canada
English-language literary awards